The Pope's Toilet is a 2007 Uruguayan film directed by César Charlone and Enrique Fernandez, starring César Troncoso, Virginia Méndez, and Mario Silva.

Plot 
It is 1988, and Melo, a Uruguayan town on the Brazilian border, awaits the visit of Pope John Paul II. Numbers begin circulating: hundreds of people will come,  thousands say the media. To the poor citizens of Melo this means  pilgrims in need of food and drink, paper flags, souvenirs, and commemorative medals. Brimming with enthusiasm, the locals hope not only for divine blessing but also a small share of material happiness. Petty smuggler Beto is certain that he's found the best business idea of all: "The Pope’s Toilet", where the thousands of visiting pilgrims can find relief.

Beto is thwarted by lack of funds and the local mobile customs enforcement officer. Ultimately the promised "60,000 to 200,000" Brazilians do not materialise. Apparently (in the film's postscript) only 400 Brazilians came, disproportionately served by 387 stalls for food and trinkets. The film makes it clear that the visit was a financial disaster to the town rather than bringing any wealth as promised. Beto has spent his daughter's college fund to no avail, but she forgives him, and at least he has a nice toilet.

Regardless of the claims made in the film's postscript committed to uphold a good sense of humor at all costs, international media reported the Pope's open-air mass in the town of Melo with 39,000 inhabitants was attended by a crowd of about 50,000 people.

Cast
César Troncoso as Beto
Virginia Méndez as Carmen 
Virginia Ruiz as Silvia
Mario Silva as Valvulina
Henry de Leon as Nacente
Jose Arce as Tica
Nelson Lence as Meleyo
Rosário dos Santos as Tereza
Hugo Blandamuro as Tartamudo

Release
The film was Uruguay's submission to the 80th Academy Awards for the Academy Award for Best Foreign Language Film, but was not accepted as a nominee. It is available in the United States from filmmovement.com.

BBC Four premiered the film on British television on 1 August 2010.

See also

 Cinema of Uruguay
 List of submissions to the 80th Academy Awards for Best Foreign Language Film

References

External links
 
 
 

2007 films
2007 drama films
Uruguayan drama films
2000s Spanish-language films
Films about Pope John Paul II
Cerro Largo Department
Melo, Uruguay
Films set in Uruguay
Films shot in Uruguay